is a Japanese live-action and anime hybrid series produced by Asmik Ace and Polygon Magic.

Plot 
Four high school students and their teacher are summoned into a different dimension by a living meteorite named Spudio the 22nd, where they are forced to solve riddles from the Sphinxes. The Sphinxes consume the souls of losing opponents, which allows them to ascend dimensions and end the world.

Characters

Junpei is a high school student and a member of the gardening club. He has a talent in solving puzzles, earning the nickname "Brain-blasting Genius."

Ryusei is Junpei's condescending childhood friend until he broke off their friendship in middle school. Ryusei also used to be part of the tennis team until a permanent wrist injury forced him to drop out. He is an honor student and admires Mr. Momoya greatly.

Yurio is a gloomy, kind-hearted student who also works as an amateur model. He maintains a large following on social media.

Tsuyoshi is a delinquent whose classmates fear him, and he was held back a year from a motorcycle accident. Since Yurio helped him, he regards him as his "angel."

Mr. Momoya is the teacher in charge of tutoring class.

The series' narrator.

Spudio is a messenger from Oedipus who was sent to summon four heroes into the dimensional classroom to fight the Sphinxes in puzzle battles. He is from the second dimension, which had been destroyed by the Sphinxes.

The Sphinx family, composed of Paramesos, Dictis, Anticheiras, and Dactila, rule the dimensional classroom, engaging in puzzle battles. They consume their opponents' souls if they lose, which allows them to ascend dimensions.

Played by: Shouta Aoi
Shiro is Mr. Momoya's high school friend who died in a car accident. He is revealed to be Oedipus reincarnated, and the one who led Spudio to their world.

Media

Anime

The series aired from January 10 to March 28, 2019 on Tokyo MX and BS Fuji. The director of the live-action segments is Yuichi Abe, while Polygon Magic provided the animation, with the five members of the main cast providing the motion capture for their characters. The animated character designs were created by Izumi. To promote the show, a radio program titled Dimension High School: After School Private Study Room was broadcast beginning October 19, 2018 on Radio Osaka, Radio Cloud, and Niconico, with Takahide Ishii and Takeo Ōtsuka as hosts. The opening theme song is "Here we go!" by Takahide Ishii, Takeo Ōtsuka, Shohei Hashimoto, and Takuma Zaiki under the name 4 Dimensions. The single was released on February 13, 2019 by Nippon Columbia and charted at #59 on the Oricon Weekly Singles Chart in its first week. The ending theme song is "My Home" by Samurai Tunes. Sentai Filmworks licensed the show for English distribution.

Halfway throughout the series, Shouta Aoi, who provides the series' narration, began appearing in the live-action segments, which was his first acting role in a drama.

Episodes

Manga
A manga adaptation illustrated by Ai Nimoda will run in Pixiv Sylph.

Reception
Editors at Anime News Network gave Dimension High School low ratings upon its first episode, criticizing its bland storytelling and poor animation, while citing the live-action segments as the only entertaining parts of the show. Volume 1 of the DVD release peaked at #24 on the Oricon Weekly DVD Charts, selling 149 copies in its first week.

References

External links
 
 

2019 anime television series debuts
Sentai Filmworks
Japanese high school television series
Japanese television series with live action and animation
Television series about teenagers